This is a list of fossiliferous stratigraphic units in British Columbia, Canada.

References

 

British Columbia
Geology of British Columbia